Boudica (released in the United States as Warrior Queen) is a 2003 British biographical-historical television film about the queen of the Iceni tribe, Boudica. It stars Alex Kingston, Steven Waddington and Emily Blunt in her film debut.

Premise 
Boudica, the Warrior Queen of Britain, leads her tribe into rebellion against the Roman Empire and the mad Emperor of Rome Nero.

Production 

The film used locations in the United Kingdom and Romania. The Boudica statue by Thomas Thornycroft near Westminster Pier, London, was used for the film's closing scenes in modern-day London. In Romania, the MediaPro Studios, Bucharest, were used.

The film has been released as A Rainha da Era do Bronze in Brazil, as La Reina de los guerreros in Argentina (video title) and as Warrior Queen in the United States.

According to the movie, King Prasutagus of the Icenii died at about the same time as the Roman emperor Claudius. However, the latter died in 54 AD, while the former died in 61 AD.

Cast 

 Alex Kingston as Boudica
 Steven Waddington as King Prasutagus
 Emily Blunt as Isolda
 Leanne Rowe as Siora
 Ben Faulks as Connach
 Hugo Speer as Dervalloc
 Gary Lewis as Magior the Shaman
 Alex Hassell as Roman Officer
 James Clyde as Roman Sergeant
 Angus Wright as Severus
 Steve John Shepherd as Catus
 Jack Shepherd as Claudius
 Gideon Turner as Didius
 Frances Barber as Agrippina the Younger
 Andrew-Lee Potts as Nero
 Theodor Danetti as Master of Ceremonies
 Cristina Serban as Iceni Mother
 Alin Olteanu as Iceni Warrior
 Emil Hostina as Arcon
 Claudiu Bleonț as Ossac
 Claudiu Trandafir as Roman Horseman
 Ion Haiduc as Captain of the Guard
 Nicodim Ungureanu as Roman Guard
 Bogdan Dumitrescu as Roman Guard
 Michael Feast as Suetonius
 Kara Tointon as Poppaea
 Jack Galloway as aide-de-camp to Suetonius
 Dominic Cooper
 Marian Iacob as Horribulus (uncredited)
 Dorjn Zaharja as Tysonius (uncredited)

See also
 List of historical drama films
 List of films set in ancient Rome

References

External links
 
 
 
 
 Warrior Queen PBS Masterpiece Theatre entry.

2003 television films
2003 films
War epic films
Incest in film
Classical war films
Romanian war drama films
English-language Romanian films
Films set in ancient Rome
Films set in the Roman Empire
Films set in the 1st century
Fiction set in Roman Britain
Films shot in Romania
Films shot in England
British biographical films
Cultural depictions of Boudica
Depictions of Nero on television
Cultural depictions of Poppaea Sabina
Cultural depictions of Agrippina the Younger
2000s English-language films
British war drama films
2000s British films
British drama television films